Omar Khalil Ismaeel Al-Hasani (born 4 February 1992) is a Jordanian former professional footballer who played as an attacking midfielder.

Career statistics

References
 Khalil Al-Hasani: "My Presence in Jordan U-22 Means A Lot to Me"

External links 
 

Living people
Jordanian footballers
Jordan youth international footballers
Association football midfielders
1994 births
Al-Salt SC players
Al-Jazeera (Jordan) players
Jordanian Pro League players
Al-Tai FC players
Saudi First Division League players
Jordanian expatriate footballers
Jordanian expatriate sportspeople in Saudi Arabia
Expatriate footballers in Saudi Arabia